Jeannette O. Wallace (January 16, 1934 – April 8, 2011) was an American politician who was a Republican member of the New Mexico House of Representatives from 1991 until her death. She was an alumnus of Arizona State University and worked in public relations.

She was married to Terry Wallace Sr., a staff member at Los Alamos National Laboratory.  Their son Terry Wallace Jr., a geophysicist, became the 11th director of Los Alamos National Laboratory in 2018.

References

1934 births
2011 deaths
Politicians from Scottsdale, Arizona
People from Los Alamos, New Mexico
Arizona State University alumni
Republican Party members of the New Mexico House of Representatives
Women state legislators in New Mexico
21st-century American women